Mariannaea is a genus of fungi belonging to the family Nectriaceae.

The genus has cosmopolitan distribution.

Species

Species:
 Mariannaea aquaticola 
 Mariannaea camptospora 
 Mariannaea catenulatae

References

Fungi